José Ensch (October 7, 1942 in Luxembourg City – February 4, 2008 in Luxembourg City) was a Luxembourgian poet.  She won the Servais Prize in 1998 for her book Dans les cages du vent.

References
Biography at the CNL (in Luxembourgish)

1942 births
2008 deaths
Luxembourgian poets
20th-century poets